Santa Rita is a municipality in the Honduran department of Copán.

History 
The municipality of Santa Rita is believed to have been founded in 1700, where it was then known as Aldea Cashapa. However, the area was not recognized as a municipality until 1875.
Also it has great people as well living in it.

Villages 
A total of 31 villages are in Santa Rita:
 Santa Rita, which is head of the municipality
 Agua Caliente
 Buena Vista
 Campamento
 El Gobiado
 El Jaral
 El Mirador
 El Planón
 El Raizal
 El Rosario
 El Tamarindo
 Gotas de Sangre
 La Canteada
 La Casita
 La Libertad
 La Reforma
 La Unión Otuta
 Las Medias
 Las Mesas
 Los Achiotes
 Los Planes de La Brea
 Los Ranchos
 Minas de Piedras
 Mirasol
 Plan Grande
 Rastrojitos
 Río Amarillo
 Río Blanco
 San Jerónimo
 Tierra Fría No.1
 Tierra Fría No.2
 Vara de Cohete

References 

Municipalities of the Copán Department

Populated places established in 1700